Pongsakorn is a masculine given name. Notable men with the given name include:

Pongsakorn Nimawan, Thai volleyball player
Pongsakorn Nondara, Thai weightlifter
Pongsakorn Paeyo, Thai wheelchair racer
Pongsakon Seerot, Thai professional footballer

Thai masculine given names